The 1957 Utah State Aggies football team was an American football team that represented Utah State University in the Skyline Conference during the 1957 NCAA University Division football season. In their third season under head coach Ev Faunce, the Aggies compiled a 2–7–1 record (1–5–1 against Skyline opponents), finished last in the Skyline Conference, and were outscored by opponents by a total of 255 to 153.

Schedule

References

Utah State
Utah State Aggies football seasons
Utah State Aggies football